Perstorp Municipality (Perstorps kommun) is a municipality in Skåne County in southern Sweden. Its seat is located in the town Perstorp.

Perstorp was made a market town (köping) in 1947. It was amalgamated with Oderljunga in the first of the two nationwide local government reforms (1952). The reform of 1971 did not bring any new amalgamations, but the köping status was abolished.

Locality
There is only 1 urban area (also called a Tätort or locality) in Perstorp Municipality, the municipal seat Perstorp, with a population of 5,468 (2005).

The name Perstorp is perhaps most known by the company Perstorp AB, based in the municipality, employing 1,800 people worldwide. They are producing chemicals market and materials technology. They are also known for a subsidiary called Perstorp Flooring, producing laminate and plastic floor material.

References
Statistics Sweden

External links

Perstorp - Official site
Coat of arms
Perstorp AB - The company Perstorp AB

Municipalities of Skåne County